Psorothamnus polydenius is a species of flowering plant in the legume family known by the common names Nevada dalea and Nevada indigobush. It is native to the deserts of the southwestern United States from the Mojave Desert in California to Utah.

Description
Psorothamnus polydenius is a shrub sometimes exceeding one meter in height. Its highly branching stems taper to twigs coated in soft, rough, or silky hairs and visible glands. The small leaves are each made up of a few pairs of oval or rounded leaflets each a few millimeters long.

The inflorescence is a dense raceme or spikelike cluster of several flowers. Each flower has a pinkish purple pealike corolla about half a centimeter long in a glandular calyx of sepals with pointed lobes. The fruit is a small legume pod containing one seed.

One variety of this species, Psorothamnus polydenius var. jonesii, is endemic to Utah.

References

External links
CalFlora Database: Psorothamnus polydenius (Dotted Dalea,  Nevada dalea, Nevada indigo bush, Nevada indigobush)   
 Jepson Manual eFlora (TJM2) treatment of Psorothamnus polydenius
USDA Plants Profile for Psorothamnus polydenius (Nevada dalea)
UC Photos gallery — Psorothamnus polydenius

polydenius
Flora of the California desert regions
Flora of Nevada
Flora of Utah
Flora of the Great Basin
Natural history of the Mojave Desert
Flora without expected TNC conservation status